General elections were held in Haiti in 1995. The presidential election, held on 17 December, resulted in a victory for René Préval of Fanmi Lavalas. The parliamentary elections, held on 25 June, 13 August and 17 September, were also won by Lavalas. Voter turnout was just 31.09% for the parliamentary elections and 27.8% for the presidential elections.

Results

President

Chamber of Deputies

Senate

References

Elections in Haiti
General
Haiti
Presidential elections in Haiti
Election and referendum articles with incomplete results